Austro-Italian War, less commonly Italo-Austrian War, may refer to:
Neapolitan War (1815)
First Italian War of Independence (1848–49)
Second Italian War of Independence (1859)
Third Italian War of Independence (1866)
Italian Campaign of World War I (1915–18)

See also
Commemorative Medal for the Italo-Austrian War 1915–1918